FC Ak Bulak is a defunct Kazakhstani football club that was based in Talgar, Almaty Province.

History
The club was formed in 2009, debuting in the Kazakhstan First Division in 2010, before ceasing to exist at the end of the 2013 season.

Domestic history

References

Association football clubs established in 2009
Defunct football clubs in Kazakhstan
2009 establishments in Kazakhstan